Ernesto Quiroga (born 11 January 1975) is a Cuban weightlifter. He competed in the men's light heavyweight event at the 2000 Summer Olympics.

References

1975 births
Living people
Cuban male weightlifters
Olympic weightlifters of Cuba
Weightlifters at the 2000 Summer Olympics
Sportspeople from Havana
21st-century Cuban people